William Ali "Bar None" Floyd (born February 17, 1972) is a former American football fullback in the NFL and current color analyst on the Seminole ISP Sports Network.

High school and collegiate career
At Lakewood High School in St. Petersburg, Florida, he compiled a 34–4 record and led the Spartans to the only undefeated regular season in school history in 1988. He earned All-Sun Coast and All-Pinellas County honors and was rated as the number one running back in the state of Florida and the number two fullback in the country by Super Prep magazine.

He enrolled at Florida State University in 1990, and helped the football team win the national championship in 1993, rushing for 321 yards and 5 touchdowns.  Floyd finished his three seasons at FSU with 640 rushing yards, 293 receiving yards, and 20 touchdowns.

Professional career
He was the premier fullback of the 1994 NFL Draft and was selected with the 28th pick of the first round by the San Francisco 49ers. Floyd is the last fullback to be selected in the first round of the NFL draft.  A brash and loud rookie but also thought to have a very bright career in front of him, he helped San Francisco win Super Bowl XXIX during his rookie year.  In a 1995 divisional playoff game against the Chicago Bears, he became the first rookie to score three touchdowns in a playoff game.  He also scored a touchdown in the NFC title game, assisting the 49ers to a 38–28 win over the Dallas Cowboys after 2 frustrating losses to Dallas in the previous 2 NFC Championship Games. In Super Bowl XXIX, Floyd rushed for 32 yards, caught 4 passes for 26 yards, and scored a touchdown in San Francisco's 49–26 victory.

Floyd's 1995 season was cut short in Week 9 when he tore three ligaments in his right knee on a goal-line running play that put him on the reserve list for the remainder of the season. He was leading the NFL in receptions (47) at the time of the injury.

He finished his career playing with the Carolina Panthers from 1998 through 2000.  In his 7 NFL seasons, Floyd rushed for 1,141 yards, caught 191 passes for 1,427 yards, returned 1 kickoff for 22 yards, and scored 25 touchdowns (20 rushing and 5 receiving).

Personal life
He lives in Orlando, Florida, with his wife Bonita and their three children William, Thai and Jaden. The family is active in his non-profit community-benefit foundation, William Floyd's Bar None Foundation ('Bar None' was his nickname while playing with the 49ers).

On April 30, 2008, Florida State University and ISP Sports announced that Floyd, who helped win a national championship for the Seminoles in 1993, would join Gene Deckerhoff as color analyst on the Seminole ISP Sports Network for radio broadcasts of FSU football games. Floyd is also in his third season as a color analyst on Tailgate Overtime, airing live every Monday at 7PM on Sunshine Network during the college football season.

Floyd also rapped one verse on the track Bay Riders by Vallejo artist Celly Cel, featured on the 2002 album, Songz U Can't Find.

References

External links
DatabaseFootball: William Floyd

1972 births
Living people
American football fullbacks
College football announcers
Florida State Seminoles football players
Florida State Seminoles football announcers
Players of American football from Jacksonville, Florida
San Francisco 49ers players
Lakewood High School (Florida) alumni
Players of American football from St. Petersburg, Florida
Carolina Panthers players
Ed Block Courage Award recipients